This is a list of all orienteers events found in Wikipedia and which are notable within the orienteering sport.

Foot Orienteering Championships

World Championships 
 World Orienteering Championships
 Junior World Orienteering Championships
World Masters Orienteering Championships
 World University Orienteering Championships

Regional Championships 
 European Orienteering Championships
 Asian Orienteering Championships

Foot Orienteering, open to everyone
Non-exhaustive list of foot orienteering events that are open to everyone:
 O-Ringen, a five-day event in Sweden where more than 10,000 orienteers participate
 Jukola Relay, held annually in Finland since 1949 where more than 18,000 orienteers participate
 Kainuu Orienteering Week, held annually in Finland with four races and ca. 4000 orienteers participate.
 Jan Kjellström International Festival of Orienteering
 The Scottish Six Days Orienteering Event, held biennially in Scotland since 1977, with typically 3,500 individual competitors
 Tiomila, a night relay competition in Sweden with 10 legs, attracting 350 teams
 25-Manna, a relay race in Sweden where each team has 25 legs for different ages and gender, held since 1974 where about 350 teams participate
 TICBCN - Trofeu Internacional Ciutat de Barcelona Two days orienteering event in a pretty city.
 Troféu de Orientação do Minho 2015, orienteering event in Portugal with three races and a Long World Ranking Event (WRE)

Ski Orienteering Championships
 World Ski Orienteering Championships
 World Cup in Ski Orienteering
 Junior World Ski Orienteering Championships

Mountain bike orienteering Championships
 World MTB Orienteering Championships

Trail orienteering championships 
 World Trail Orienteering Championships
 European Trail Orienteering Championships
 European Cup in Trail Orienteering

Mountain marathon events 

 Lowe Alpine Mountain Marathon
 Original Mountain Marathon
 Saunders Lakeland Mountain Marathon
 The Highlander Mountain Marathon
 The Capricorn Mountain Marathon

See also 
 Orienteering
 List of orienteers
 List of orienteering clubs
 Orienteers category
 Orienteering clubs category
 Orienteering competitions category

 
Orienteering
Orienteer